The Blue Bird is a 1940 American fantasy film directed by Walter Lang. The screenplay by Walter Bullock was adapted from the 1908 play of the same name by Maurice Maeterlinck. Intended as 20th Century Fox's answer to MGM's The Wizard of Oz, which had been released the previous year, it was filmed in Technicolor and tells the story of a disagreeable young girl (played by Shirley Temple) and her search for happiness.

Despite being a box office flop and losing money, the film was later nominated for two Academy Awards. It is available on both VHS and DVD.

Plot
The setting is Germany during the Napoleonic Wars. Mytyl, the bratty and ungrateful daughter of a wood cutter, finds a unique bird in the royal forest and selfishly refuses to give it to her sick friend Angela. Mother and Father are mortified at Mytyl's behavior. That evening, Father is called on to report for military duty the next morning.

Mytyl is visited in a dream by a fairy named Berylune who sends her and her brother Tyltyl to search for the Blue Bird of Happiness. To accompany them, the fairy magically transforms their dog Tylo, cat Tylette and lantern into human form. The children have a number of adventures: they visit the past (meeting their dead grandparents who come to life because they are being remembered), escape a scary fire in the forest (caused by Tylette's lies to the trees in a treacherous attempt to make the children quit their journey), experience the life of luxury and see the future, a land of yet-to-be born children.

Mytyl awakes as a kinder and gentler girl who has learned to appreciate her home and family. The following morning, Father receives word that a truce has been declared and he no longer must fight in the war. Mytyl is inspired to give the unique bird, now revealed to be the eponymous Blue Bird that she had sought throughout her journey, to Angela.

Cast

Opening credits

End credits

Four-year-old Caryll Ann Ekelund appears as an unborn child in the film. On Halloween 1939, Ekelund's costume caught fire from a lit jack-o-lantern. She died from her burns several days later and was buried in her costume from the film. Ekelund came from a showbusiness family; her older sister was actress Jana Lund.

The character played by Gene Reynolds is a yet-to-be-born Abraham Lincoln, indicated by Alfred Newman's theme from the previous year's Young Mr. Lincoln.

Production
Despite a lingering myth that Shirley Temple was originally cast in The Wizard of Oz, she had been only briefly considered because she was a proven box-office draw. Arthur Freed, an uncredited producer on The Wizard of Oz, wanted rising child star Judy Garland for the lead role. When producers listened to Temple's singing voice, they were unimpressed. Temple would not have been available in any event because Fox refused to loan her to other studios.

When The Wizard of Oz became a success and shot Judy Garland to fame, Fox moved to create their own fantasy feature starring Temple and based on the 1909 fantasy play The Blue Bird by Maurice Maeterlinck. Walt Disney had previously attempted to purchase the rights to the play to create an animated adaptation.

In imitation of The Wizard of Oz, the opening scenes are in black-and-white (though without a sepia tint), although the opening credits are in color. But unlike in The Wizard of Oz, when The Blue Bird changes to full color, it remains as such for the remainder of the film.

Producer Darryl F. Zanuck changed the Tyltyl character (played by Johnny Russell) to be much younger than Temple's Mytyl character, as he felt that a boy of closer age would have to be mentally incompetent to allow a girl to take leadership away from him. Zanuck also dropped some of the characters in the original story such as Bread, Water, Fire, Milk, Sugar and Night, as he wanted the story to focus more on Temple as the star. He also wanted to cast Bobs Watson as Tyltyl, Gene Lockhart as Daddy Tyl, Joan Davis as Tylette, Jessie Ralph as Mrs. Berlingot, Anita Louise as Light, Zeffie Tilbury as Granny, George Barbier as Grandpa, Andy Devine as Cold in Head and Berton Churchill as Time. During the writing of the screenplay, Temple's mother objected to her daughter's characterization as "too nice" and also raised concerns that the script did not focus enough on her. The tension came to a head when Zanuck threatened suspension, and after consulting with their lawyer, the Temples agreed to proceed with the film as planned.

It was shot on location in Lake Arrowhead, California with a $2 million budget, employing the Technicolor process.

Almost a month prior to its release, The Blue Bird was dramatized as a half-hour radio play on the December 24, 1939 broadcast of CBS Radio's The Screen Guild Theater, starring Temple and Nelson Eddy. During the performance, as Temple was singing "Someday You'll Find Your Bluebird," a woman arose from her seat and brandished a handgun, pointing it directly at Temple. She froze just long enough for police to stop her. It was later discovered that the woman's daughter had died on the day she mistakenly believed Temple was born, and blamed Temple for stealing her daughter's soul. The woman did not know that Temple was born in 1928, not 1929.

Differences between film and play
The film, although following the basic plot of the play, greatly embellishes the story and does not contain the play's original dialogue. The opening black-and-white scenes and the war subplot were invented for the film. Mytyl's selfishness, the basic trait of her personality, is a plot thread specifically written into the motion picture that is not present in the original play.

The play begins with the children already asleep and the dream about to begin, and there is no depiction of the family's daily life as in the film.

Music
Alfred Newman's original score to The Blue Bird was released in 2003 by Screen Archives Entertainment, Chelsea Rialto Studios, Film Score Monthly and Fox Music. The album contains the entire score as heard in the film in chronological order. It was produced using rare preservation copies of the original nitrate optical scoring sessions, which were digitally restored by Ray Faiola. The rare limited edition includes an illustrated 24-page color booklet with liner notes by film and music historians Jon Burlingame and Faiola, detailing the film's production and scoring.

Track listing
 Main Title - 1:17
 The Royal Forest - 3:19
 Selfish Mytyl/Come O Children One and All/Returning Home with the Bird - 7:32
 Awaking in Technicolor/Tylo and Tylette on Two Legs/Search for the Blue Bird - 10:04
 In the Graveyard - 3:44
 There Are No Dead People/Granny and Grandpa - 4:57
 Lay-De-O (sung by Shirley Temple) - 1:00
 Leaving Granny and Grandpa - 1:29
 The Land of Luxury - 4:44
 Carousel in the Foyer - 0:40
 Fighting Over the Horse - 1:13
 Fed Up with the Land of Luxury - 5:35
 Escape - 1:51
 Return to "Light" - 1:43
 Tylette Summons the Trees/Forest Fire - 8:09
 Boat to Safety/The Land of Unborn Children - 5:30
 Father Time/The Children are Born - 8:01
 Returning Home - 1:57
 Waking Up/Finale - 5:15
 End Cast - 0:58
Total Time: 79:12

"The Land of Unborn Children" includes a few bars from Newman's theme for the previous year's Young Mr. Lincoln, as the Studious Boy played by Gene Reynolds is a yet-to-be-born Abraham Lincoln.

Awards
The film was nominated in two categories at the 13th Academy Awards ceremony:
Academy Award for Best Cinematography - (Arthur Miller, Ray Rennahan)
Academy Award for Best Visual Effects - (Fred Sersen (photographic), Edmund H. Hansen [uncredited] (sound))

Film Products

Dolls
Shirley Temple Blue Bird dolls were first made in the 1940s to coincide with the film (Composition Shirley's had started in production in 1934). These dolls were dressed to look like Mytyl (Shirley's Character). They could come in many variants, different sizing's, costumes and face molds. Younger face (chubbier with less rosy cheeks) Older Shirley face (Slimmer head mold with make up by the eyes) Each doll is marked with "Shirley Temple" either on the head or the body (There are many variants to the marking but they will always say Shirley) and comes in a cardboard box with a Shirley Temple doll button on the dolls outfit.

13 inch doll with a light blue dress with white sleeves and white section on the front where a felt bluebird can be seen in the middle, she can be found wearing white shoes with a button strap with white socks (many turned off white over time). 

16 Inch Shirley doll with a dress with a white top half and a bottom blue skirt section. This skirt section has a white pinafore lied over it with one blue bird on the side of the bottom of the pinafore. On top is a red tie up vest/bodice. Again with the white/off white oil cloth shoes and whitish socks the same as the 13 inch.

18 Inch Shirley doll is much like the 16 inch but the differences lie in the birds being on both sides of the pinafore and no lace up on the bodice as well as a much lighter skirt section and much darker birds.

20 Inch Shirley dolls outfit is exactly like the 16 inch, she also wears a blue ribbon in her hair.

Its important to remember that these are the most common variations. Since the dolls clothes were made a lot of the time with extra fabric and by housewives (since the Ideal toy company couldn't keep up with the dolls high demand they had woman working out of their homes to help them finish with production) they have many valid slight variations caused by this "non factory" setting. Most Shirley clothes you will be able to find marked with her name on the inside tag to verify if its legit. 

Danbury mint for a dress up Shirley temple doll also made a Blue Bird outfit. It comes with a dark blue jacket bodice and dress piece with white on the top and a skirt with dark blue with some dark red and thin white striped mixed in. Also came with it were moccasin type brown shoes.

Shirley Temple Blue Bird Figurines
After the ending of the one and only official company licences to produce Shirley Temple toy merchandise Ideal was dissolved, Danbury Mint soon took over. Creating many Shirley items. One being the Shirley Blue Bird resin figurines.

The November Figure- As part of a month line up there is a Shirley figure in a blue dress with a blue ribbon in her hair smiling while holding a bluebird on her wrist close to her face atop of a stand marked November. 

A figure from their Silver Screen Collection Depicts her standing in the grass and flowers holding the bluebird up high on one finger looking at it in awe.

Shirley Temple VHS and DVD'
Coming in both a cardboard cover and a plastic hard shell was the VHS Shirley movie set release of Blue bird. The front featuring an up close shot of Shirley holding a bluebird on her finger looking to the left at it. On the side it is marked 17 and has a full body image of Shirley holding her bluebird in a small basket cage.

For the DVD version there is only one, it is a pink case (Number 13 out of the DVD collection) it features a smiling Shirley looking outward holding a bluebird on her finger.

The Shirley Temple Blue bird ornaments produced by Danbury Mint. From 2012 it features a profile photo of Shirley from the movie and it has a star at the top saying Shirley Temple.

See also 
 List of American films of 1940
 Shirley Temple filmography
 The Blue Bird (1976), also released by 20th Century Fox

References

Bibliography

External links
 
 
 
 
 
 Shirley Temple Assassination Shirley Facts

1940 films
1940s children's fantasy films
20th Century Fox films
American children's fantasy films
American fantasy adventure films
American films based on plays
1940s fantasy adventure films
Films based on works by Maurice Maeterlinck
Films directed by Walter Lang
Films partially in color
Films produced by Darryl F. Zanuck
Films scored by Alfred Newman
Works based on The Blue Bird (play)
Films shot in California
Films set in Germany
1940s English-language films
1940s American films